Victoria High School, commonly referred to as Vic High, is a high school located in Victoria, British Columbia, Canada. It is the oldest public high school west of Winnipeg, Manitoba and north of San Francisco, California.

History
The high school opened on August 7, 1876, in a log cabin with two classrooms on the school reserve between Yates Street and Fort Street bounded by Fernwood Road, the grounds of the current Central Middle School  building.  This same cabin had been the first common (or public) school in British Columbia when it was used as a primary school starting in 1853. In 1882, the high school moved to a new wing of a brick building that had been built in 1875–1876 and had been used exclusively as the primary school until occupied by the high school.  By 1882 the high school included 80 students and was situated between the primary girls' school in the east wing and the primary boys' school in the west wing. The high school remained pressed between the boys' and girls' central schools until 1903.  Victoria's growing population in the 1890s led to Victoria High School being described as "one of the most inadequate school buildings in the Province" by the principal Edward Paul.  In 1902 a third Victoria High School was opened which was also quickly outstripped by Victoria's burgeoning population. This facility was designed by Francis Mawson Rattenbury, architect of the British Columbia Parliament Buildings and The Empress Hotel (or Fairmont Empress Hotel).

Designed by C. Elwood Watkins, School Architect for the Victoria Board of Education, the school cost slightly more than $460,000. The high school's first principal was S. J. Willis.

The Rattenbury-designed school was demolished in 1953 and in 1954 a new Central Junior High School building was constructed.  The school was later known as Central Junior Secondary (grades 7 and 8) and  currently as a middle school offering French immersion (grades 6–8).

Peter L. Smith, himself a graduate of Victoria High School and son of Henry Lawson Smith, longtime principal of Vic High (1934–1955), wrote a history of the school to mark its centennial celebrations in 1976: Come Give a Cheer: One Hundred Years of Victoria High School.

When the province renamed all its high schools "secondary school", Victoria High School, Oak Bay High School, and Esquimalt High School were the only schools to retain "high school" as part of their names.

Victoria College
In 1903, Victoria College (the precursor to the University of Victoria) started as an annex to the high school on the Fort Street site. During 1914–15 Victoria College was located on the top floor of the new Grant Street building. When the University of British Columbia opened in 1915, Victoria College suspended operation until 1920 when it reopened at nearby Craigdarroch Castle.

Facilities

Architecture
The current school building, which was designed in 1911 and opened in 1914, has been listed on the City of Victoria's Heritage Registry since 1982.

The foundations of the school are made of impressively heavy 4-foot-square blocks of granite. The building has two ornate facades, including some very large windows which offer prime views of downtown Victoria and the Fernwood neighbourhood. The building is U-shaped, with a large auditorium inside the U. Additions to the school have turned the spaces between the auditorium and the rest of the building into inaccessible courtyards.

The school has two gymnasiums, one of which is from 1914 and is notable for having a wooden running track suspended 20 feet above its floor. There is a rifle range in the attic, and there is an old tradition that the graduating students sign their names there. There are three large underground floors for storage and boiler rooms.

There are two war memorials in the school's main entrance, one for the First World War and another for the Second World War. After the Second World War a large flag (four stories high) was commissioned. It had blue and red maple leaves on it, each representing a student or staff member who died in the war, respectively. It was then lost until 2005, when it was found in the school's basement. For Remembrance Day it was hung from the school's fourth floor.

Fairey Tech
Technical education shops were first opened at Vic High in 1943 as part of the training effort for the Second World War.  The facilities were built to the west of the playfield by trainee soldiers with assistance from Vic High students. Trades such as carpentry, bricklaying, and metalwork were taught.  In September 1949 classes began in new Industrial Arts facilities which had been added onto the south end of the wartime building to provide shops for electrical, automotive, sheet metal, welding and woodwork plus classrooms and drafting rooms.  The enlarged facility was named the F.T. Fairey Technical Unit after Col. F.T. Fairey, the former Deputy Minister of Education, the then-current provincial Director of Industrial and Technical Education and also the Regional Director of the Canadian Vocational Training Program.  Fairey Tech immediately became a focal point for technical education in Victoria and beyond, both for daytime and evening adult education classes.  Additions were made to the facility In the 1950s, including a much larger auto-shop complex and an electronics shop and classroom.  Later renamed the Fairey Technical Centre, in addition to previous disciplines it also housed classes for industrial design, art metal and jewelry, and even dance.  The facility was closed in 2011 and replaced with the Fairey Technical Building, a new 57,000 square foot addition to the north side of the main school building.

French immersion
Vic High offers a French immersion program, functioning as a pathway school for both late immersion and some early immersion students from Central Middle School.

Fine arts
Vic High offers a fine arts program, including theatre, music, and dance.  There was a neighbourhood choir and a Rhythm and Blues Band

Athletics
The following athletic programs were offered as of the 2017–2018 school year:

 Badminton
 Basketball
 Cross country running
 Rowing
 Rugby (Girls and Boys 7's)
 Soccer
 Swimming
 Track and field
 Volleyball
 Weight room training
 Intramural programs: basketball, indoor soccer and ring hockey

Athletic accomplishments:
2016–17 AAA Sr Boys Basketball South Island Champions, 
2017–18 AAA Sr Girls Volleyball South Island Champions

The current athletic director is Erin Finlayson.

Weather station
Vic High hosts an active weather station as part of the School-Based Weather Station Network, operated as a partnership between the University of Victoria and several school districts to provide state of the art interactive technologies as part of the school's science program.

Former principals
S. J. Willis
Ira Dilworth 1926–1934
Henry L. Smith 1934–1955
H.D. Dee
G.A.V. Thompson
J.D. (Duncan) Lorimer 1965–1979
Jack (John) Lowther
Bill (William) Garner
David Watkins 1985–1989
Keith McCallion 1989–1994
Dennis Harrigan 1994–2002
Keith Forshaw 2002–2006
Stephen Bennett 2006–2010
Randi Falls 2010–17
Aaron Parker 2017–

Notable alumni

Samuel Maclure, architect
Simon Fraser Tolmie, premier of British Columbia
Byron Ingemar Johnson, premier of British Columbia
Emily Carr, artist
David Anderson, Canadian cabinet minister and MP
Alan Lowe, mayor of Victoria
Torchy & Doug Peden, internationally acclaimed cyclists
Dr. Norma Mickelson, OBC, OC, renowned educator
Dr. Wallace Chung, respected medical researcher and innovator
Jim Taylor, nationally acclaimed sports writer
Dr. A.J. Stewart Smith, world-renowned particle physicist
Dr. Maria Tippett, leading Canadian cultural historian
David Day, internationally acclaimed author
Richard Hunt, renowned First Nations artist
Jack Shadbolt, world-renowned contemporary artist
Carol Sabiston, world-renowned textile artist 
Jessica Monroe-Gonin, Olympic rowing medalist
Sam Dunn, award-winning documentary filmmaker
Hans de Goede, internationally acclaimed rugby player
Mark Wyatt, rugby player
 Michiel Horn, professor emeritus of history and university historian at Glendon College, York University, in Toronto
 Mohammed Elewonibi, football player
 Joseph Clearihue, lawyer
 Danielle Bennett, artist
 Barry M. Gough, renowned historian and author
 Sid Barron, editorial cartoonist
 Stephen Dorsey, author, Black and White, An Intimate Multicultural Perspective on "White Advantage" and the Paths to Change (Nimbus Publishing 2022)

References

External links
Victoria High School
Vic High Alumni Association
Vic High Alumni Archives
School Report Card

High schools in Victoria, British Columbia
Educational institutions established in 1876
1876 establishments in British Columbia